A Synchronous Serial Port (SSP) is a controller that supports the Serial Peripheral Interface (SPI), 4-wire Synchronous Serial Interface (SSI), and Microwire serial buses. A SSP uses a master-slave paradigm to communicate across its connected bus.

See also
 Serial Peripheral Interface Bus

Serial buses